Prototypes of the upper stage of the SpaceX Starship have been flown nine times. Designed and operated by private manufacturer SpaceX, the flown prototypes of Starship so far are Starhopper, SN5, SN6, SN8, SN9, SN10, SN11, and SN15.

Starship is planned to be a fully-reusable two-stage super heavy-lift launch vehicle. Unusual for previous launch vehicle and spacecraft designs, the upper stage of Starship is intended to function both as a second stage to reach orbital velocity on launches from Earth, and also eventually be used in outer space as an on-orbit long-duration spacecraft. It is being designed to take people to Mars and beyond into the Solar System.

Prototypes

Low-altitude flights

High-altitude flights

Planned orbital launches

Starship test flights  

Eight prototype Starship second stage vehicles, each with different vehicle configurations, have flown nine suborbital test flights in the period between July 2019 and May 2021.  

SpaceX testing is proprietary, and the company does not release a detailed set of test objectives for their vehicle development test flights. All test flights have been launched from the Starbase launch site at Boca Chica in southern Texas.

By August 2021, the iterative development work at the South Texas facility had become focused on the first orbital test flight of the two-stage Starship system.

Starship second-stage sub-orbital flights

Future operational flights 
SpaceX has on various occasions made a few public statements about preliminary ideas for future operational orbital flights using the Starship system.  All dates for future flights are speculative, and therefore approximate and "no earlier than" (NET) dates.  Moreover, it is difficult to compare the dates in the tables since they have come from different sources and at different times over the past three years.

Elon Musk has stated that Starship would fly hundreds of times before launching with humans. A likely use of some of these flights would be to launch Starlink satellites.

Other flights 

The HLS variant of Starship was selected by NASA in April 2021 to be the lander for the Artemis missions to the Moon. Artemis 3 is intended to be the first human mission to the Moon to use Starship for long-duration crewed lunar landings as part of the Artemis program.

According to space journalist Mike Wall in 2020, Musk is said to envision that eventually more than 1,000 Starships could be needed to depart for Mars every 26 months, which could lead to the development of a sustainable Martian city in 50–100 years.

Notes

References 

launches
Starship